Megaloceroea recticornis is a species of plant bugs in the Miridae family, that is found throughout the British Isles, much of mainland Europe, and North America.

Description
Adults length is 8–10 mm, the colour of which is green.

Ecology
Both adults and larvae feed on various grasses, usually on meadow foxtail, red fescue, timothy and yarrow (as illustrated).

References

See also
 List of heteropteran bugs recorded in Britain

Miridae
Insects described in 1785